The church dedicated to St. Paul the Apostle is located in the south of Brugherio and it is part of the pastoral community Epiphany of the Lord.

History
After the building of Edilnord, in the south of Brugherio it was in need to provide religious care to the residents of the new district. So, on spacious grounds donated by Cazzaniga family, it was built a pastoral center auxiliary to the main parish. At first, the community gathered in a large hall where all the sacred vessels were placed and which was perceived by the faithful more and more like a real church.
In 1971, with the official recognition of the community as a parish, the first parish priest, Father Michele Raffo, came. In 1991 the renovations began, giving to the building the appearance of a church, both inside and outside.

Architecture
When the building was renovated, the most important and significant project concerned the chancel: the French sculptress Marie-Michèle Poncet was assigned to realize its main décor such ambon, altar, tabernacle and baptistery.
The artist created her works in pink marble from Portugal, which its formal and chromatic characteristics are combined harmoniously to the red-green macchiavecchia, precious material from Switzerland, widely used in the Ambrosian churches and for this chancel.
Poncet was inspired by the meaning of the Christian cross, which was described by Pope John Paul II as "the beginning of everything". She placed then, at the center of the altar, a cross that appears between two bearing blocks of marble and represents the creation, as well as the origin and core of life.
The ambon is designated as "place of the Word". Its main features are two characters, placed facing one another: a prophet, holding the Tables of the Law, who figures the Old Testament, and an evangelist who is the symbol of the New Testament, carrying a cross.
The position of the arms and bodies of the two draws an X, which represents the Christian cross.
The shelf below the church tabernacle recalls an angel's wing, because the Eucharist is celebrated as "the bread of angels".
The baptismal font is the last marble element made by the French artist. It is located in the chapel housed in the counterfaçade. The baptismal font brings to mind a capital and depicts water, fire, robe and chrism: basic symbols of the liturgy of baptism in Christian tradition.

References

Bibliography

External links
 
 
 

Tourist attractions in Lombardy
Churches in Brugherio
Buildings and structures completed in 1974
20th-century Roman Catholic church buildings in Italy